Chengannur State assembly constituency is one of the 140 state legislative assembly constituencies in Kerala state in southern India. It is also one of the 7 state legislative assembly constituencies included in the Mavelikara Lok Sabha constituency. As of the 2018 Chengannur Assembly Bypoll, the current MLA is Saji Cheriyan of CPI(M).

Local self governed segments
Chengannur Niyamasabha constituency is composed of the following local self governed segments:

Members of Legislative Assembly 
The following list contains all members of Kerala legislative assembly who have represented the constituency:

Key

Election results 
Percentage change (±%) denotes the change in the number of votes from the immediately previous election.

Niyamasabha Election 2021

2018 by-election 
Due to the death of the sitting MLA K. K. Ramachandran Nair, Chengannur Niyamasahba constituency went to bypoll on March 28, 2018. There were 2,00,137 registered voters in the constituency for the by-election.

Niyamasabha Election 2016 
There were 1,97,372 registered voters in the constituency for the 2016 Kerala Niyamasabha Election.

Niyamasabha Election 2011 
There were 1,76,875 registered voters in the constituency for the 2011 election.

See also
 Chengannur
 Alappuzha district
 List of constituencies of the Kerala Legislative Assembly
 2016 Kerala Legislative Assembly election

References 

Assembly constituencies of Kerala

State assembly constituencies in Alappuzha district